Bloodflowers is the eleventh studio album by English rock band The Cure. It was first released in Japan on 2 February 2000, before being released in the UK and Europe on 14 February 2000 and then the day after in the US by Fiction Records and Polydor Records. Singer Robert Smith chose to not release any single from the album, against the will of the record company. However, "Maybe Someday" and "Out of This World" were issued as promotional singles to radio in the UK, US, Canada and numerous territories in Europe. Bloodflowers received mixed reviews from critics. "Watching Me Fall" was featured in the end credits of the 2000 horror film American Psycho.

Release and promotion
No commercial singles were released from Bloodflowers, but two promotional singles were released to DJs and radio stations: "Out of This World", in January (Europe) and May (US), and "Maybe Someday", in January (US) and April (Europe). "Maybe Someday" managed to peak at No. 10 on the Alternative Airplay chart. Bloodflowers was a moderate success, debuting at number 16 on the US Billboard 200. It was nominated for a Grammy Award for Best Alternative Music Album in 2001. In subsequent years, Smith identified it as his favourite Cure album in a 2004 Rolling Stone interview.

Reception

The album received mixed reviews. Entertainment Weekly called it "one of the band's most affecting works".

Melody Maker titled their review "Goth-Awful!", rating the album 1.5 out of 5. Rolling Stone criticized the quality of the compositions, saying,  "[Smith] can write four bad songs in a row, and Cure albums tend to leak filler like an attic spilling insulation" and concluded, "Bloodflowers, is half dismissible droning, an unforgivable ratio considering it's only nine tracks long." Similarly, Trouser Press stated in their review: "The album sounds completely uninspired, as Smith and company go through the motions of Cure-ness." Les Inrockuptibles wrote that the album featured "endless songs" with "dated sounds". AllMusic noted that although Bloodflowers contained all the Cure's musical trademarks, "morose lyrics, keening vocals, long running times", "the album falls short of the mark, largely because it sounds too self-conscious".

Track listing

Personnel
The Cure
 Robert Smith – guitar, keyboard, 6-string bass guitar, vocals
 Simon Gallup – bass guitar
 Perry Bamonte – guitar, 6-string bass guitar
 Jason Cooper – percussion, drums
 Roger O'Donnell – keyboards

Production
Robert Smith – production, mixing
Paul Corkett – production, engineer, mixing
Sacha Jankovich – engineer
Ian Cooper – mastering
Daryl Bamonte – project coordinator
Perry Bamonte – photography
Paul Cox – photography
Alex Smith – photography
Alexis Yraola – logo

Charts

Certifications and sales

References

2000 albums
Albums recorded at RAK Studios
The Cure albums
Elektra Records albums
Fiction Records albums
Polydor Records albums